Miloš Buchta (born 19 July 1980) is a Czech footballer who plays for 1. FC Tatran Prešov. Previously he played for Sigma Olomouc.

References

External links

1980 births
Living people
Czech footballers
Association football goalkeepers
Czech First League players
SK Sigma Olomouc players
1. FC Tatran Prešov players
AS Trenčín players
CS Gaz Metan Mediaș players
ASC Oțelul Galați players
FC Rapid București players
Slovak Super Liga players
Liga I players
Czech expatriate footballers
Expatriate footballers in Romania
People from Svitavy
Expatriate footballers in Slovakia
Czech expatriate sportspeople in Slovakia
Czech expatriate sportspeople in Romania
Sportspeople from the Pardubice Region